Shaarawy (or Al Shaarawy, Al Shaarawi, etc.) is an Arabic surname. Notable people with the surname include:

 Muhammad Metwally Al Shaarawy (1911–1988), Egypt Islamic scholar and jurist
 Stephan El Shaarawy (born 1992), Italian football player of Egyptian descent

Arabic-language surnames